The table below shows the comparison of the performances of all the 221 clubs that participated in Copa Sudamericana until the edition of 2022.

Classification

Notes: Since 2017, clubs transferred from Copa Libertadores are marked in italics. Since 2021 a group stage was included in the tournament and the second stage was eliminated.

Performance

References

External links
Copa Sudamericana on RSSSF

See also
Copa Sudamericana
Copa Sudamericana records and statistics
List of Copa Sudamericana finals

Association football comparisons
Copa Sudamericana records and statistics